Massimo Morsello (10 November 1958, Rome – 10 March 2001) was an Italian fascist political and singer-songwriter. He was the main figure of Italian fascist political music and, with Roberto Fiore, a co-founder of the Italian neo-fascist movement Forza Nuova. He was born in Rome on 10 November 1958. He died in London on 10 March 2001.

Biography 
Massimo Morsello was born in a middle-class family of Rome. His mother was Bulgarian, and fled to Italy after the Communist takeover. He described his father as "deeply anticommunist" and an admirer of the social philosophy of Fascism.

In 1975, at the age of 16, he joined the Italian post-fascist party Movimento Sociale Italiano. He became a member of the juvenile political association Fronte della Gioventù and, although not attending a university, joined FUAN, an organization of right-wing university students. FUAN was less dependent on parliamentary politics than other organizations, and it was something of a thinktank of the Italian far-right youth in the late 1970s.  During the so-called "Anni di Piombo" or Lead Years he became involved in various violent episodes and is thought to have possibly been a member of the neofascist terrorist organization Nuclei Armati Rivoluzionari. He was sentenced to 9 years and 6 months for crimes related to terrorism.

In these years he also began his career as a musician, with his first performance being at the first Hobbit Camp. He gained the nickname Massimino among the far-right members of Italian society.

After the Bologna massacre of 2 August 1980, Massimo Morsello, Roberto Fiore, leader of Terza Posizione and seven other people were accused of subversive association.
They will then acquitted in 1990. They escaped first to Germany, then, after a few months, to London.  Italy called for their extradition but it was refused by England because the crimes they were accused of were only political. It has been rumoured that Morsello and Fiore escaped extradition by collaborating with the MI6.

At the beginning of their exile, Morsello and Fiore survived by taking temporary work in restaurants. In 1986, thanks to their friendship with various far-right exponents like Nick Griffin, they managed to found "Meeting Point", which was later renamed "Easy London". Easy London is a society that helps young students and workers live and work in London by providing jobs, beds, and contracts. This rapidly made Morsello and Fiore wealthy (the profits being around 15 million euros), but the society was more of a fundraising tool to help various far-right organizations in Italy. "Easy London" is still active.

While in London, Morsello continued his musical activities. He played a concert entitled Scusate, ma non-posso venire ("Sorry, but I can't come in") that was transmitted to Italy by satellite on 22 July 1996.

In the second half of the 1990s, Morsello was diagnosed with cancer. He attempted the controversial somatostatin therapy of Luigi Di Bella, with no success.  In April 1999 Morsello was able to return to Italy without being incarcerated due to his worsening health condition. He nevertheless still managed to play music until his death in 2001 and helped Fiore found Forza Nuova.

Music 
While most Italian right-wing musicians are influenced by Celtic music or Oi!, Morsello instead put far-right political themes into a more traditional acoustic, folk guitar-based songwriting. His self-admitted main influence is the Italian singer and songwriter Francesco De Gregori. In his later works he tried to develop a more personal style, influenced by psychedelia, especially in songs like Otto di Settembre and Vandea. His lyrics focused on themes like revolution, nationalism, Fascism, abortion and European Union, all from an unambiguously far-right point of view.

The songs of Morsello are often of good quality and can be safely compared to those of much more famous Italian political left-wing songwriters like Francesco Guccini or Claudio Lolli. A self-proclaimed Fascist, his far-right political leanings, as expressed in his songs, won the praise of far-right supporters, but hindered his acceptance by the mainstream public. His first three albums were released as demo tapes and only later re-mastered on CD. Nevertheless, he was the best selling far-right Italian songwriter, selling 15,000 copies of his record Punto di non-ritorno.

Morsello took advantage of the low profile he had in the mainstream to play a prank on the Italian communist newspaper Il Manifesto. He published a half-page ad of his record La direzione del vento declaring it "a truly revolutionary record" and emphasizing his friendly stance towards the Palestinians, one of the few platforms he shared with the far-left. The day after, the newspaper, having discovered from letters sent by its readers the identity of Morsello, publicly apologized and tried to give back the money paid by Morsello.

Discography 
Per me… e la mia gente (1978), first released as demo tape
I nostri canti assassini (1981), first released as demo tape
Intolleranza (1990), first released as demo tape
Punto di non-ritorno (1996)
Massimino, a compilation featuring his first two demo tapes (1997)
La direzione del vento (1998)

See also

External links 
 Massimo Morsello official website – Contains discography, photos, and various other material. 
 An eBook with a long interview and many lyrics (PDF) 
 A short interview from a nationalist fanzine 
 A page about the connections between Morsello, Fiore and Easy London

See also 
 
 Amici del Vento
 Compagnia dell'Anello
 Sotto Fascia Semplice
 Zetazeroalfa

1958 births
2001 deaths
Musicians from Rome
Italian neo-fascists
Third Position
20th-century Italian musicians